Choline kinase alpha is an enzyme that in humans is encoded by the CHKA gene.

The major pathway for the biosynthesis of phosphatidylcholine occurs via the CDP-choline pathway. The protein encoded by this gene is the initial enzyme in the sequence and may play a regulatory role. The encoded protein also catalyzes the phosphorylation of ethanolamine. Two transcript variants encoding different isoforms have been found for this gene.

In melanocytic cells CHKA gene expression may be regulated by MITF.

Clinical significance
Mutations of the CHKA gene cause a neurodevelopmental disorder with epilepsy and microcephaly.

References

External links

Further reading